Roland Varga, born 1990, is a Hungarian professional footballer.

Roland Varga may also refer to:

 Roland Varga (discus thrower) (born 1977), Hungarian discus thrower
 Roland Varga (canoeist) (born 1990), Canadian canoeist